XIX Corps was a corps of the Union Army during the American Civil War.  It spent most of its service in Louisiana and the Gulf, though several units fought in Virginia's Shenandoah Valley.

XIX Corps was created on December 14, 1862, and assigned to Maj. Gen. Nathaniel P. Banks, the commander of the Department of the Gulf.  The corps comprised all Union troops then occupying Louisiana and east Texas.  It originally consisted of four divisions, numbering 36,000 men.

Port Hudson
In April 1863, the corps was involved in the actions at Fort Bisland and Irish Bend. It operated the Siege of Port Hudson from April 27–July 9, 1863, the fall of which, along with that of Vicksburg, Mississippi, closed off the Mississippi River to Confederate shipping.  XIX Corps also gained measure of distinction for being the first Federal unit to use a large number of colored troops in action, particularly against Port Hudson, with Banks giving them due credit for their valiant contributions to the siege.

MG Nathaniel P. Banks
 Chief of Staff: BG George L. Andrews, BG Charles P. Stone

Red River Campaign
In spring of 1864, the corps took part in Banks' disastrous Red River Campaign, under the command of William B. Franklin, who was wounded at Mansfield.  After its conspicuous role in the failure, two divisions under William H. Emory were sent to Virginia to join Phillip Sheridan's operations in the Shenandoah Valley against Jubal Early (see Valley Campaigns of 1864). These troops took part in all of the major engagements of Sheridan's campaign, most notably at Opequon, where they lost some 2,000 men killed or wounded (mostly in Cuvier Grover's division).

Georgia
After this, the corps was sent Savannah, Georgia, where it remained until the end of the war. The XIX Corps was officially disbanded on March 26, 1865, but the corps took part in the Grand Review in Washington, and some of its units remained in Savannah and Louisiana until 1866.

References

External links 
XIX Corps history

19
Military units and formations established in 1862
1862 establishments in the United States
Military units and formations disestablished in 1865